Daochuo (562–645), was a Chinese Buddhist scholar of the Mahāyāna Mahāparinirvāṇa Sūtra who later became an eminent scholar of Pure Land Buddhism. In Chinese Buddhist tradition, he is considered the second patriarch of Pure Land Buddhism while In Jōdo Shinshū, he is considered the Fourth Patriarch.

Life and teachings
Daochuo was born and raised in Bingzhou, Shanxi. According to legend, Daochuo visited the temple of Tan-luan in 609 and read an epitaph on the wall that venerated Tanluan.  Daochuo was so impressed by this inscription that he took up the pursuit of Pure Land Buddhism over his previous studies, including nianfo and daily recitation of the Infinite Life Sutra.

Among Daochuo's contributions to Pure Land Buddhism was his distinction that there existed two Paths in Buddhism: the holy path (monastic practices leading to the purification of the mind) and the pure land path (relying on Amitābha's grace).  He also linked the Buddhist concept of the Three Ages of Buddhism with the salvation of Amitābha by teaching that Amitābha's compassion was particularly suited on those living in the current degenerate age.

Some believe that Daochuo's habit of counting his recitations with beans is the origin of Buddhist prayer beads.

References

Bibliography

External links
 

Pure Land Buddhists
Tang dynasty Buddhist monks
562 births
645 deaths
People from Lüliang
Chinese spiritual writers
Tang dynasty writers
Writers from Shanxi
Northern Zhou Buddhist monks
Sui dynasty Buddhist monks
Jōdo Shin patriarchs